The Australian Natural History Medallion is awarded each year by the Field Naturalists Club of Victoria (FNCV) to the person judged to have made the most meritorious contribution to the understanding of Australian Natural History. The idea originated with J. K. Moir, a book collector and member of the Bread and Cheese Club. Moir wrote to the FNCV in 1939 suggesting that such a medallion should be awarded to a person who had performed, in his words, ‘a signal service’ to the protection of flora and fauna—‘a variation of the Nobel awards’. Nominations for the Medallion are made by field naturalist clubs and kindred bodies from all over Australia, each nomination being valid for a three-year period. The Medallion has usually been awarded annually since 1940. In that time, recipients have been honoured for their work in many fields of natural history studies, and have come from every state and territory in Australia.

The list of Medallionists and the year of the award is as follows: 
 1940 – Alexander Hugh Chisholm 
 1941 – Frederick Chapman
 1942 – David Fleay
 1943 – Herbert Ward Wilson
 1944 – John McConnell Black
 1945 – Charles P. Mountford
 1946 – Heber A. Longman
 1947 – Philip Crosbie Morrison
 1948 – Ludwig Glauert
 1949 – Edith Coleman
 1950 – Bernard C. Cotton
 1951 – Tarlton Rayment
 1952 – John Burton Cleland
 1953 – Charles Leslie Barrett
 1954 – Herman M. R. Rupp
 1955 – Stanley R. Mitchell
 1956 – Dominic Louis Serventy
 1957 – Charles Ernest William Bryant
 1958 – Charles J. Gabriel
 1959 – Keith Alfred Hindwood
 1960 – James Hamlyn Willis
 1961 – Emil H. Zeck
 1962 – Norman Arthur Wakefield
 1963 – Thistle Y. Stead
 1964 – Winifred Waddell
 1965 – Roy Wheeler
 1966 – J. Ros Garnet
 1967 – Gilbert P. Whitley
 1968 – Norman Barnett Tindale
 1969 – Charles Austin Gardner
 1970 – Jean Galbraith
 1971 – Alexander Clifford Beauglehole
 1972 – Allen Axel Strom
 1973 – Edmund D. Gill
 1974 – Vincent Serventy
 1975 – Alison M. Ashby
 1976 – Winifred M. Curtis
 1977 – John Russell (Jack) Wheeler
 1978 – Allan Roy Sefton
 1979 – Helen Aston
 1980 – Michael Tyler
 1981 – Elizabeth Marks
 1982 – Howard Jarman
 1983 – Trevor Pescott
 1984 – Kevin Keneally
 1985 – Jack Hyett
 1986 – Graham Pizzey
 1987 – Robert G. H. Green
 1988 – John Dell
 1989 – Bruce A. Fuhrer OAM
 1990 – Ellen McCulloch
 1991 – Fred J. C. Rogers
 1992 – Enid L. Robertson
 1993 – Alan J. Reid
 1994 – Joan Cribb
 1995 – W. Rodger Elliott
 1996 – Ken N.G. Simpson
 1997 – Geoffrey Monteith
 1998 – Peter W. Menkhorst
 1999 – Mary P. Cameron
 2000 – Malcolm Calder
 2001 – Alan B. Cribb
 2002 – Ian D. Endersby
 2003 – Clive Dudley Thomas Minton
 2004 – David Lindenmayer
 2005 – Pauline Reilly
 2006 – Ian Fraser
 2007 – Jeanette Covacevich
 2008 – Ern Perkins
 2009 – Richard Shine AM
 2010 – Don P. A. Sands OAM
 2011 – John Woinarski
 2012 – No award made
 2013 – Marilyn Hewish
 2014 – Tom May
 2015 – Margaret MacDonald
 2016 – Max S. Moulds OAM
 2017 – Paul Adam
2018 – Sarah Lloyd
2019 – Simon Grove
2020 – Craig Morley
2021 – Peter Latz

References

External links 
Australian Natural History Medallion webpage
 Field Naturalists Club of Victoria

Nature conservation in Australia
Australian science and technology awards
1940 establishments in Australia